The Australia women's national soccer team represents Australia in international  association football. It is fielded by Football Australia, the governing body of soccer in Australia, and competes as a member of the Asian Football Confederation, having previously been a part of the Oceania Football Confederation. This is a list of Australia women's international soccer players who have played for the national team in an "A" international match.

The first official international football match took place on 6 October 1979. Over 220 players have represented Australia in a full "A" international match since then. 

Clare Polkinghorne, cap no. 140, is Australia's most capped player with 154 appearances for the national team.

Players
Caps and goals are current as of 22 February 2023 after the match against Jamaica. Players in bold are currently active, having been called up to the squad in the last 12 months.

Notes

References

 
Australia
Association football player non-biographical articles